is the name of a short street in Kamakura, Kanagawa, Japan, which begins in front of Tsurugaoka Hachiman-gū, the city's most important Shinto shrine and ends in front of Hōkai-ji. It is believed to be the street that passed in front of the so-called Ōkura Bakufu, seat of first shōgun Minamoto no Yoritomo's first government, which was in turn a section of the old Kanazawa Kaidō.

Notes

References
 

Kamakura, Kanagawa